Rochia virgata, common name the striped top shell, is a species of sea snail, a marine gastropod mollusk in the family Tegulidae.

Description
The height of the shell attains 45 mm, its diameter 40 mm. The solid, imperforate shell has a conic-pyramidal shape. It is white, above longitudinally broadly flammulated with red. The spire is somewhat attenuated and concave on its upper portion, then slightly convex. The sutures are linear. The 10 whorls are nearly planulate. The apex is acute. The sculpture of the spire consists of spiral prominently beaded lirae, about eight on each whorl. The body whorl is carinated at the periphery. The base of the shell is plano-concave, indented in the center, finely, densely lirate. These lirae are minutely beaded, red, articulated with white, the interstitial furrows white. The aperture is subrhomboidal, denticulate within the base. The columella is short, oblique, ending in a tubercle below, simply entering, not plicate, above.

Distribution
This species occurs in the Red Sea and in the Indian Ocean off Chagos, Madagascar, the Mascarene Basin and Mauritius.

References

 Dautzenberg, Ph. (1929). Contribution à l'étude de la faune de Madagascar: Mollusca marina testacea. Faune des colonies françaises, III(fasc. 4). Société d'Editions géographiques, maritimes et coloniales: Paris. 321–636, plates IV-VII pp. 
 Kilburn, R. N. 1972. Taxonomic notes on South African marine Mollusca (2), with the description of new species and subspecies of Conus, Nassarius, Vexillum and Demoulia. Annals of the Natal Museum 21(2):391-437, 15 figs.
 Drivas, J. & M. Jay (1988). Coquillages de La Réunion et de l'île Maurice
 Herbert G.G. (1993). Revision of the Trochinae, tribe Trochini (Gastropoda: Trochidae) of southern Africa. Annals of the natal Museum 34(2):239-308.

External links
 
 Gmelin J.F. (1791). Vermes. In: Gmelin J.F. (Ed.) Caroli a Linnaei Systema Naturae per Regna Tria Naturae, Ed. 13. Tome 1(6). G.E. Beer, Lipsiae
 Alf, A. (2021). Was wissen wir über die Tegulidae?. Club Conchylia Mitteilungen. 38: 49-60

 virgata
Gastropods described in 1791